Pueblo Nuevo is a census-designated place (CDP) in Webb County, Texas, United States.This was a new CDP formed from parts of the Laredo Ranchettes CDP and additional area prior to the 2010 census with a population of 521.

Geography
Pueblo Nuevo is located at  (27.493908, -99.309882).

Education
Residents are in the United Independent School District. Zoned schools include: Freedom Elementary School, Raul Perales Middle School, and United South High School.

The designated community college for Webb County is Laredo Community College.

References

Census-designated places in Webb County, Texas
Census-designated places in Texas